The Outside Chance of Maximilian Glick is a 1988 Canadian film based on the novel by Morley Torgov. The film was shot in Winnipeg and Beausejour, Manitoba.

Plot
The early 1960s: In preparation for his Bar Mitzvah, a Jewish boy from a small Manitoba community with an overbearing family tries to navigate his coming-of-age with his family's condescension and bigotry using his sarcastic Jewish humor. The town's rabbi dies, and a subplot develops in which Max's father and grandfather (synagogue leaders) are saddled with a traditional Hassidic rabbi who sticks out like a sore thumb among the otherwise assimilated Jewish community. To make matters more difficult, Max likes a Catholic girl, with whom he later duets in a piano competition. The quirky, fun-loving rabbi tries to help him with his problems, yet harbours a secret ambition of his own.

Primary cast
Noam Zylberman - Maximilian Glick
Jan Rubeš - Augustus Glick
Susan Douglas Rubeš - Bryna Glick
Sharon Corder - Sarah Glick
Aaron Schwartz - Henry Glick
Howard Jerome - Zelig Peikes
Nigel Bennett - Derek Blackthorn
Fairuza Balk - Celia Brzjinski
Saul Rubinek - Rabbi Teitelman

Production

Primary filming was done in Winnipeg, Manitoba and Beausejour, Manitoba in November and December 1987. Exterior filming was done in both locations, and many interior scenes were filmed in an abandoned apartment building in Winnipeg that had been renovated by the film crew with 1960s decor. When it was first discovered, the building had neither water nor heat, but the crew did such good renovation work that Winnipeg officials later decided to convert it into low cost housing once production was complete. Synagogue and piano competition scenes were filmed at the Baha'i Temple of Winnipeg.

Outdoor filming was hampered by a lack of snow in late 1987, and contingency plans were made to complete filming in early 1988 if snow did not appear during the original 25 day shooting schedule. Snow did finally appear in the final days of filming.

The film's budget was $2.4 million, and was produced in association with The National Film Board of Canada and the Canadian Broadcasting Corporation. Financing was provided by Telefilm Canada, Film B.C., and the Canada-Manitoba Cultural Industries Development Office. At the time, it was the largest feature film to be shot entirely in Manitoba, and production happened to occur during a period when Telefilm Canada was experiencing major financial difficulties. At one point during shooting, finances were so tight that producers had scheduled a meeting with cast and crew to announce a shutdown in filming until the following spring - but they were able to cancel the meeting hours later when the required funds were secured.

The film was subsequently adapted into the CBC Television comedy-drama series Max Glick.

Awards and nominations

The film received nominations at the 1989 Genie Awards for
 Best Motion Picture
 Best Actor in a Leading Role (Saul Rubinek)
 Best Actress in a Supporting Role (Susan Douglas Rubeš)
 Best Adapted Screenplay (Phil Savath)
 Best Costume Design (Charlotte Penner)

At the 1988 Toronto International Film Festival, it won the award for Best Canadian Feature Film.

References

External links

1988 films
Canadian coming-of-age comedy-drama films
English-language Canadian films
Films based on Canadian novels
Films shot in Winnipeg
Films set in the 1960s
National Film Board of Canada films
Films set in Manitoba
Films directed by Allan A. Goldstein
Films about Jews and Judaism
1980s coming-of-age comedy-drama films
Jewish Canadian films
1988 comedy films
1988 drama films
1980s English-language films
1980s Canadian films
1988 directorial debut films